The  is a limited express train service in Japan operated by Shikoku Railway Company (JR Shikoku), which runs from  to , and .

The Uzushio service was introduced on 10 April 1988.

Route
The main stations served by this service are as follows.

 -  - .

Rolling stock
 KiHa 185 series 2-, 3-, or 4-car DMUs (since 1988)
 2600 series 2-, or 4-car tilting DMUs (since 2017)
 2700 series 2-, 3-, 4-, or 5-car tilting DMUs (since 2019)

Most trains are operated by 2700 series, while some are operated by 2600 series.  Only some train services are operated by Kiha 185 series.

Past rolling stock
 KiHa 181 series DMUs (1993)
 2000 series tilting DMUs (1999–2011)
 N2000 series tilting DMUs (1998–2020)

History
Uzushio services were introduced on 10 April 1988. From May 1998, N2000 series tilting DMUs were introduced.

References

 JR Timetable, August 2008 issue
 "ＪＲ新幹線＆特急列車ファイル" (JR Shinkansen & Limited Express Train File), published 2008 by Kōtsū Shimbun

External links

 JR Shikoku Train Information 

Named passenger trains of Japan
Shikoku Railway Company
Railway services introduced in 1988